The 1986–87 Southern Jaguars basketball team represented Southern University during the 1986–87 NCAA Division I men's basketball season. The Jaguars, led by head coach Ben Jobe, played their home games at the F. G. Clark Center and were members of the Southwestern Athletic Conference. They finished the season 19–12, 9–5 in SWAC play to finish in second place. They were champions of the SWAC tournament to earn an automatic bid to the 1987 NCAA tournament where they lost in the opening round to Temple.

Roster

Schedule

|-
!colspan=9 style=| Regular season

|-
!colspan=9 style=| 1987 SWAC tournament

|-
!colspan=9 style=|1987 NCAA tournament

Awards and honors
Avery Johnson – SWAC Player of the Year, NCAA assists leader, NCAA record single-season assists average (10.74)

References

Southern Jaguars basketball seasons
Southern
Southern
South
South